East Fork Township may refer to:

East Fork Township, Faulkner County, Arkansas, in Faulkner County, Arkansas
East Fork Township, Clinton County, Illinois
East Fork Township, Montgomery County, Illinois
 East Fork Township, Haywood County, North Carolina
East Fork Township, Benson County, North Dakota
East Fork Township, Williams County, North Dakota, in Williams County, North Dakota

Township name disambiguation pages